Eyes is an American crime drama television series starring Tim Daly as Harlan Judd that aired on ABC from March 30 to April 27, 2005.

In May 2005, having rescheduled the sixth episode twice, ABC announced that they would not be airing the remaining episodes until June at the earliest. They later announced that it would not be picked up for a second season and that the remaining episodes would remain unaired.

New Zealand television station TV2 picked up this show and aired the complete series, all twelve episodes, in the second half of 2005. These episodes appeared online via BitTorrent soon after. The show was also partially aired on Singapore television station Mediacorp Channel 5, with the pilot episode and episodes #106 to #112 being skipped. Episode #111 ("Burglary") was an exception, and was aired as the fifth episode. The show was also aired in full on France cable television station Canal Jimmy in 2006. In the beginning of 2008 the show was aired in full on Polish television station TVN 7. The series was scheduled to be shown on the Nine Network in Australia in late 2005 but the network declined to air the series due to its cancellation in the US.

Episodes could formerly be seen for free on the website In2TV. Not all episodes were available (including the pilot episode), but most unaired episodes were online.

In March 2009 American satellite broadcaster DirecTV announced a deal made with Warner Bros. to show all episodes of the series on its The 101 Network channel. Eyes airing on DirecTV began on September 15, 2009.

Premise
The series follows the firm of Judd Risk Management which uses marginally legal means to investigate individuals and crimes where law enforcement would fall short. With the help of high-tech gadgets, Harlan Judd and his employees recover money for victims as well as investigate individuals for clients but still manage to keep plenty of secrets from one another.

Cast and characters
 Tim Daly as Harlan Judd
 Garcelle Beauvais as Nora Gage
 A. J. Langer as Meg Bardo
 Laura Leighton as Leslie Town
 Eric Mabius as Jeff McCann
 Rick Worthy as Chris Didion
 Natalie Zea as Trish Agermeyer

Episodes

See also
 Private investigator

References

External links
 
 Variety article about show's airing on Direct TV

2000s American crime drama television series
2005 American television series debuts
Gay-related television shows
2005 American television series endings
American Broadcasting Company original programming
Television series by Warner Bros. Television Studios
Television series created by John McNamara (writer)
Television shows set in Los Angeles